Cologne University of Applied Sciences, officially called TH Köln – University of Applied Sciences (abbreviated TH Köln) is an institute of higher education located in Cologne, Germany, established in 1971. It was created from a merger of numerous smaller colleges, the oldest of which was the Royal Provincial Trade School, founded in 1833, and renamed Trade College of the City of Cologne on 15 December 1879.

TH Köln is the largest University of Applied Sciences in Germany by number of students, having about 27,000 students and 430 professors and headquartered in Cologne Südstadt. The TH Köln offers a total of 100 bachelor's and master's degree programs in full. The other big universities of Cologne are the University of Cologne and the German Sport University Cologne.

Faculties 

 Faculty of Applied Social Sciences (F01)
 Faculty of Cultural Sciences (F02)
 Faculty of Information Science and Communication Studies (F03)
 Faculty of Business, Economics and Law (F04)
 Faculty of Architecture (F05)
 Faculty of Civil Engineering and Environmental Technology  (F06)
 Faculty of Information, Media and Electrical Engineering (F07)
 Faculty of Automotive Systems and Production (F08)
 Faculty of Process Engineering, Energy and Mechanical Systems (F09)
 Faculty of Computer Science and Engineering Science (F10)
 Faculty of Applied Natural Sciences (F11)
 Faculty of Spatial Development and Infrastructure Systems (F12)
 Institute for Technology and Resources Management in the Tropics and Subtropics
 Köln International School of Design

Locations 
TH Köln has campuses in Cologne at Südstadt for faculties related to humanities, Deutz for faculties related to engineering, and Mülheim for the Cologne Game Lab. It also operates two campuses in Gummersbach for computer science and Leverkusen for chemistry.

International 

The Department of International Affairs at the TH Köln offers student exchange opportunities with more than 360 partner universities in 94 countries. The TH Köln is also one of seven members of UAS7, which represent the seven leading German universities of applied sciences internationally.

See also 
 German Apsara Conservation Project

References

External links 
 Website 
 Department of International Affairs - English  Accessed January 12, 2016.
 German Universities of Applied Sciences, Alliance for Excellence  Accessed January 12, 2016.

 
Educational institutions established in 1971
Innenstadt, Cologne
1971 establishments in Germany
Universities of Applied Sciences in Germany
Universities and colleges in Cologne